Sandra Fenichel Asher is an American author and playwright, known most notably for her contributions to  the fields of children's theater and literature. She has written over 30 novels and stories, but is most well known for her plays such as A Woman Called Truth and In the Garden of the Selfish Giant.

Education 
Asher attended Indiana University where she completed a B.A. in English with a minor in Theatre in 1964. In 1974 she received her Elementary Education Certification from Drury University.

Novels and Stories

Young Adult Novels

Beginning Reader Series: Ballet One

Chapter Books

Children's Picture Books

Books for Writers

Non-Fiction Books

Plays

Critical Reception 
A Woman Called Truth, a play based on the life of Sojourner Truth, is perhaps Asher's most recognized stage-play. The New York Times called it a "smart, strong play", stating that it "is bound to make young viewers believe that changes are indeed possible".

References 

American dramatists and playwrights
Year of birth missing (living people)
Living people